Solána Imani Rowe (born November 8, 1989), known professionally as SZA, is an American singer and songwriter. Born in St. Louis, she began making music in the early 2010s, releasing two extended plays, See.SZA.Run (2012) and S (2013), before signing with the hip hop record label Top Dawg Entertainment, through which she released Z (2014), her third EP and first retail release. That same year, she co-wrote "Feeling Myself" with Nicki Minaj and Beyoncé. In 2016, she was featured on Rihanna's song "Consideration".

SZA's first full-length album, Ctrl (2017), was released to universal acclaim from music critics. It became the second longest-charting R&B album by a woman in the history of the US Billboard 200, and was certified triple platinum by the Recording Industry Association of America (RIAA). At the 60th Annual Grammy Awards, the album earned her four nominations, including Best New Artist. It was later placed on Rolling Stones 500 Greatest Albums of All Time list (2020). In August 2017, she was featured on Maroon 5's top-ten hit single "What Lovers Do". The next year, she was nominated for the Golden Globe Award and Academy Award for Best Original Song for her collaboration with Kendrick Lamar on the top ten single "All the Stars" for the Black Panther soundtrack.

In 2020, she released the single "Good Days"; the following year saw the release of the singles "I Hate U" and Doja Cat's "Kiss Me More", which she was featured on; all three singles reached the top ten on the Billboard Hot 100 in 2021, with the latter breaking the record for the longest-running all-female collaboration within the top ten, and earning her the Grammy Award for Best Pop Duo/Group Performance. SZA's second album, SOS (2022), reached number-one on Billboard 200 chart, breaking the record for the biggest streaming week ever for an R&B album, and remained atop the chart for ten non-consecutive weeks. The album's singles "Nobody Gets Me" and "Kill Bill" were both top-ten hits; the latter peaked at number one on the Billboard Global 200 charts.

SZA has received multiple accolades throughout her career, including an American Music Award, a Grammy Award, a Guild of Music Supervisors Award, and two awards from Billboard Women in Music (including Woman of the Year), in addition to nominations for an Academy Award, a Golden Globe Award, and a Brit Award.

Early and personal life
Solána Imani Rowe was born on November 8, 1989 and was raised in Maplewood, New Jersey. Her father was an executive producer at CNN, while her mother was an executive at AT&T. Rowe has an older half-sister, Panya Jamila, and an older brother, Daniel, aka Manhattan, a rapper. Her mother is Christian and her father is Muslim. She was raised as a Muslim and continues to follow Islam. 
It's like the belief in one God, all the pillars of Islam et cetera, and I think those are ideas that will never leave me, those make sense in my spirit. It's the way that I connect with God; it has always made sense to me. I think I would love to wear my hijab but I feel like I don't wanna wear my hijab and talk crazy on stage and be in videos with Travis Scott. Like I don't wanna be disrespectful because I have too much love and respect for the religion, for my father, and for myself.
She attended a Muslim prep school every day after her regular schooling. Due to the September 11 attacks, Rowe was subjected to bullying in 7th grade, leading her to stop wearing her hijab. Rowe attended Columbia High School, where she was active in sports, including gymnastics and cheerleading.
After graduating from high school in 2008, Rowe later went to three separate colleges, finally settling at Delaware State University to study marine biology. She eventually dropped out in her last semester, immediately taking on random jobs in order to make money. Rowe formed her stage name from the Supreme Alphabet, taking influence from rapper RZA of the Wu-Tang Clan. The last two letters in her name stand for Zig-Zag and Allah, while the first letter S can mean either savior or sovereign.

Career

2011–2014: Career beginnings and EPs

SZA first met members of Top Dawg Entertainment during the CMJ New Music Report in 2011, when her boyfriend's clothing company sponsored a show in which Kendrick Lamar was performing. Her early music was given to TDE president Terrence "Punch" Henderson, who was surprised with the quality of the material. The two stayed in touch, and after SZA began generating buzz with the release of her two EPs, TDE stepped in to sign her in 2013, making her the label's first female artist. SZA's early music was recorded with her friends and neighbors in which they "stole a bunch of beats off the Internet". On October 29, 2012, SZA self-released her debut EP See.SZA.Run.

On April 10, 2013, SZA released her second EP, S, which was met with positive reviews from music critics. SZA promoted the extended play with the release of a music video for the song "Ice Moon", directed by Lemar & Dauley. On July 14, 2013, Top Dawg signed SZA. In October 2013, SZA went on a four show tour with Swedish band Little Dragon; starting on October 17 at the El Rey Theater in Los Angeles and ending on October 24 at the Music Hall of Williamsburg, Brooklyn, NY.
In December 2013, SZA released the song "Teen Spirit" which was followed by the release of a remix featuring American rapper 50 Cent, along with a music video directed by APlusFilmz. In 2014, SZA featured on a variety of songs from her label-mates albums including two songs for Isaiah Rashad's debut EP Cilvia Demo as well as featuring on Schoolboy Q's first album Oxymoron.

On March 26, 2014, she released the single "Child's Play" featuring Chance the Rapper and produced by Dae One & XXYYXX. A studio EP, Z, was released on April 8, 2014; the lead single, "Babylon" was accompanied with a music video directed by APlusFilmz. To promote Z, SZA performed at several performance showcases at the SXSW Music Festival in Austin, Texas. SZA made her chart debut in the UK, where Z charted at number thirty-two on the R&B Charts, during the week ending April 19, 2014. Z debuted on the US Billboard 200 at number thirty nine, selling 6,980 copies in its opening week; the album also peaked at number nine on the Billboard Hip hop/R&B chart.

SZA subsequently began recording her fourth EP, A. In July 2014, SZA featured on Kitty Cash's single "Moodring". Later that month, SZA released a collaboration with Jill Scott called "Divinity". On July 11, 2014, SZA released a video for her song "Julia" from Z. In December SZA and The Internet supported Aiko's "Enter The Void" tour. On November 18, 2014, SZA released a song called "Sobriety".

2015–2018: Ctrl and breakthrough

Whilst working on A, (now repackaged as her debut album and later retitled Ctrl), SZA began writing songs for other female artists including Beyoncé and Rihanna. Along with Rihanna and Tyran Donaldson, SZA co-wrote "Consideration" for Rihanna's album Anti (2016); besides writing, SZA also appeared on the track and later performed "Consideration" with Rihanna live at the 2016 Brit Awards on February 24, 2016.

In January 2017, SZA released "Drew Barrymore", the lead single from her upcoming album Ctrl. On April 28, 2017, SZA signed her first major-label recording contract with RCA Records. On June 9, 2017, SZA released her debut album, Ctrl, to universal acclaim from music critics, scoring an 86 out of 100 rating on Metacritic. Ctrl debuted at number three on the US Billboard 200, with 125,000 album-equivalent units, of which 80,000 were pure album sales; the album was supported by several singles, including "Love Galore", which peaked in the Top 40 of the Billboard Hot 100 chart and was later certified platinum. Ctrl was ranked as the best album of 2017 by Time.

From August 20 to December 22, 2017, SZA promoted the album on a North American concert tour. SZA opened for the European portion of Bryson Tiller's "Set It Off Tour" in support of his album True to Self from October 17, 2017, to November 30, 2017, separate from SZA's tour.

In August 2017, SZA collaborated with American pop rock band Maroon 5 on their single "What Lovers Do" from their sixth studio album Red Pill Blues. The single reached number 9 on the Billboard Hot 100. This marked SZA's first top-ten hit as a featured artist on the Hot 100. The following month SZA released "Quicksand", which appeared on the soundtrack for HBO's Insecure, and, alongside Khalid and Post Malone, was featured on the remix version of Lorde's single "Homemade Dynamite", from her second studio album Melodrama. Also in 2017, SZA worked on a joint album with Mark Ronson and Tame Impala.

On November 28, 2017, SZA received five Grammy nominations including one for Best New Artist. She received the most nominations of any female artist for the 2018 Awards and was the fourth most nominated artist in total. Despite this, she did not end up winning any of the awards she was nominated for.

In January 2018, SZA featured with Kendrick Lamar on the track "All the Stars", which was released as the lead single to the soundtrack album of the film Black Panther. The single peaked at number 7 on the Billboard Hot 100, and this made SZA's second top-ten hit on the chart, after Maroon 5, "What Lovers Do" which peaked at number 9 on the chart. SZA collaborated with Cardi B on the track "I Do" for the album Invasion of Privacy.

2019–present: Collaborations and SOS

In May 2019, SZA featured on DJ Khaled's eleventh studio album, Father of Asahd, on the track "Just Us". A music video was later released for the song. On February 26, 2020, SZA and Justin Timberlake released "The Other Side", a song part of the Trolls World Tour soundtrack, alongside its music video. In March 2020, SZA signed with WME for representation in all areas. SZA performed, together with artists such as Bruce Springsteen, Bon Jovi and Halsey, a benefit concert for the state of New Jersey, in support of the state's work fighting the COVID-19 pandemic. It took place on April 22, 2020, through at-home performances and the revenue will go to the New Jersey Pandemic Relief Fund. On May 25, 2020, SZA showed interest on Twitter in releasing "a music dump" of previously unreleased material, potentially containing 20 songs.

In August 2020, SZA tweeted and deleted, "At this point y'all gotta ask punch," referring to Terrence "Punch" Henderson, who is president of Top Dawg Entertainment. In another tweet, SZA indicated that "all [Punch] says to her" about releasing new music is "soon." This revealed that her relationship with her label owner Punch (Top Dawg Entertainment) has been hostile since the delays of her second album which was last announced back in an interview in 2019. SZA came back with her first release as a lead artist since 2017 on September 4, 2020, with "Hit Different", featuring Ty Dolla Sign, and production from The Neptunes. On December 25, 2020, SZA released "Good Days" on streaming platforms as a single after it originally debuted as a snippet in the outro of the "Hit Different" music video. English singer Jacob Collier provided background vocals for the single. The song hit its peak of number 9 on the Billboard Hot 100, making it SZA's first top-ten single as a solo artist, despite SZA herself revealing that it was not initially planned to be a single. Both tracks were expected to appear on her then upcoming second studio album.

On April 9, 2021, SZA was featured on the Doja Cat single "Kiss Me More". It became a number-one hit in New Zealand and reached the Top 40 in over a dozen countries, further having earned top-ten placements in the United States, Canada, the United Kingdom, Australia, Ireland and Lithuania. The song also has a music video which premiered the same day as the single and was directed by Warren Fu.

In late 2021, SZA's cover of "The Anonymous Ones" was released. It is a song written for the soundtrack of the 2021 film adaptation of Dear Evan Hansen. Her version of the song also plays during the closing credits of the film itself.

A long-awaited collaboration from SZA with Summer Walker, "No Love" was finally released on November 5, 2021,  after previously being teased back in late June via Walker's Instagram. After its success on the R&B charts, it later became an official single when the extended version was released in March the following year, along with a music video.

On December 3, 2021, SZA released the song "I Hate U", after it went viral on TikTok; it was originally released exclusively on SoundCloud in August 2021. SZA confirmed after the 64th Annual Grammy Awards that she had finished her second album and is planning on releasing it "soon".

On June 9, 2022, SZA released a deluxe version of her debut studio album Ctrl to commemorate its 5-year anniversary. It featured 7 previously unreleased songs, such as "2AM", "Jodie", "Percolator", and an alternative version of "Love Galore" without Travis Scott.

On October 28, 2022, a new single called "Shirt" has been released, alongside its music video starring actor LaKeith Stanfield. The song was originally teased by SZA in late 2020 and after it gained popularity on TikTok because of a viral challenge, a snippet appeared as an outro at the end of the official music video of "Good Days". SZA teased another snippet of a song at the end of her new song's music video which she revealed to be called "Blind".

On her 33rd birthday on November 8, 2022, SZA released a teaser titled "PSA" on her Instagram. The video ends with a morse code for "S.O.S.", sparking speculations about an upcoming project. On November 16, 2022, Billboard officially confirmed that her second studio album is titled SOS and was set for a December release date. On November 30, 2022, SZA posted the cover of her upcoming album SOS to her Instagram account. After performing "Shirt" and "Blind" on NBC's Saturday Night Live, SZA announced that the album would be released on December 9, 2022. The album has so far spent its first five weeks atop the Billboard 200 Albums Chart in the United States, becoming the first female R&B album of the 21st Century to achieve this feat.

In 2023, Rolling Stone ranked SZA at number 180 on its list of the 200 Greatest Singers of All Time.

Influences

Music

SZA's vocal style has been described as taking on the "lilt" of a jazz singer. SZA is known as TDE's first female signee and first singer, which also drew attention during the early stages of her career. According to Marissa G. Muller of Rolling Stone magazine, SZA's vocals alternate between a "vapory husk and a sky-high falsetto". Jordan Sargent of Pitchfork magazine labeled SZA's vocals as being "chillwave" and "ethereal". SZA disputes her music being labelled as hip hop, R&B and pop, stating she often listens to a variety of music including Stevie Nicks, classical jazz, folk, and rap. Further, she said: "when you try to label it [her music], you remove the option for it to be limitless. It diminishes the music." SZA began writing songs due to being "passionate" about writing, and enjoyed poetry; when writing lyrics, SZA "freestyles" them in order to express whatever comes to her "mind", noting that it does not always make sense to herself. Thematically, SZA's work contains "unravelling lyrics", that touch upon themes of sexuality, nostalgia, and abandonment.

SZA's musical style has been described as "alt R&B". SZA's songs are built over "layers of sliced, delayed, and reversed vocals" and contains "twists and mutates". Reggie Ugwu from Billboard magazine found her musical style to feature an "agnostic utopia dripping with mood", that straddles the "line between minimalist R&B, '80s synth pop and soul". SZA's music is primarily PBR&B and neo-soul, but has been noted for taking influences from a broad variety of genres including soul, hip hop, minimalist R&B, indie rock, cloud rap, ethereal R&B, witch house and chillwave elements. Michael Madden described SZA's musical style as being characterized by "genre agnosticism", noting that her work is not just one style of music and is versatile, noting the musical style is not just "R&B, pop, soul, or one thing at all".

SZA listens to Ella Fitzgerald for vocal influence, and has said that Lauryn Hill is one of her personal influences. SZA also cites a wide range of musical artists as influences, including Meelah, the Red Hot Chili Peppers, LFO, Macy Gray, Common, Björk, Jamiroquai, and "a lot of Wu, Nas, Mos Def, Hov". Speaking on her influences, SZA said: "[My] personal influences came from dancing with American Ballet Theatre and doing pieces to Björk [music]. That's the only time I had really any outside influence to music. So, the people that I fell in love with on a musical level were always much older. Jamiroquai is just, like, the shit for me." In an interview for Live Nation Entertainment, SZA described the meeting she had with Beyoncé for the writing of the song "Feeling Myself", affirming "Beyoncé might be the most perfect, beautiful being I've ever met in my whole life. She's the most inspirational woman on earth, next to my mother". SZA also spoke about Rihanna, admiring her strong and confident attitude, of someone who does only the music she wants to do, and that if there's anybody that she could imagine singing her words, it would be Rihanna. SZA has expressed admiration for singer Ashanti, citing her as a major inspiration and someone she's loved since childhood.

Fashion
During an interview, SZA said she is less inspired by strictly music, and more inspired by creating art in general; she has looked up to people who were not "typical artists" including her "favorite gymnast, ice-skater, saxophonist, painter, or movie director," continuing to say she was particularly inspired by film director Spike Lee. During an interview with W, SZA spoke on her style influences, saying a large amount of her style inspiration comes from movies, including Wes Anderson films, praising his use of "pantone color palette" and that she "would love to dress like a character from Moonrise Kingdom. Or perhaps Bill Murray in The Life Aquatic." Along with her music, SZA's image has been compared to neo-soul artists Lauryn Hill and Erykah Badu. SZA's hair became a point of interest during the early stages of her career and she discussed it in interviews with Vogue and Harper's Bazaar.  During her performances, SZA tends to wear "free-flowing" clothes that are easy to move around in and wears pajamas or baggy clothing onstage.

Discography

Ctrl (2017)
SOS (2022)

Tours
Headlining
Ctrl the Tour (2017–2018)
 SOS Tour (2023)

Co-headlining
The Championship Tour  (2018)

Supporting
 Jhené Aiko – Enter the Void Tour (2014)
 Jessie J – Sweet Talker Tour (2015) 
 Bryson Tiller – Set It Off Tour (2017)

Awards and nominations 

Throughout her career, SZA has gained one Grammy Award from fourteen nominations, a Golden Globe nomination, and an Academy Award nomination. She has earned one American Music Award, one Billboard Music Award, two MTV Video Music Awards, two BET Awards, including Best New Artist in 2018, and received the "Rulebreaker Award" at the Billboard Women in Music event in 2018. SZA also won the Soul Train Music Award for Best New Artist in 2017.

In September 2022, SZA was applauded as one of the rising stars on the TIME100 Next List. At the 2022 Grammy Awards, SZA won with Doja Cat for Best Pop Duo/Group Performance for their hit collaboration "Kiss Me More".

See also
Top Dawg Entertainment discography

Notes

References

External links

 
21st-century African-American women singers
African-American Muslims
African-American women singer-songwriters
Alternative R&B musicians
American contemporary R&B singers
Columbia High School (New Jersey) alumni
Grammy Award winners
Living people
People from Maplewood, New Jersey
RCA Records artists
Singer-songwriters from New Jersey
Top Dawg Entertainment artists
1989 births
American Muslims